Karl Wagner is the name of:

Karl Edward Wagner (1945–1994), American writer of fantasy stories
Karl Wagner (bobsleigh) (born 1907), Austrian bobsledder who competed in the early 1950s
Karl Wagner (luger), German luger who competed in the 1920s
Karl Willy Wagner (1883–1953), German pioneer in the theory of electronic filters

See also
Carl Wagner (disambiguation)
Wagner (surname)